is the 36th single by Japanese entertainer Akina Nakamori. Written by Seriko Natsuno and Keiko Utsumi, the single was released on May 21, 1998, by Gauss Entertainment under the This One label. It was also the second single from her 18th studio album Spoon.

The single peaked at No. 66 on Oricon's weekly singles chart and sold over 12,000 copies, becoming her lowest-charting single.

Track listing

Charts

References

External links 
 
 

1998 singles
1998 songs
Akina Nakamori songs
Japanese-language songs